Bojan Kosić (born in Nikšić December 14, 1990) is a Montenegrin alpine skier. He was the sole competitor for Montenegro at the 2010 Winter Olympics.

References 

1990 births
Living people
Sportspeople from Nikšić
Montenegrin male alpine skiers
Olympic alpine skiers of Montenegro
Alpine skiers at the 2010 Winter Olympics